Panhorst Feed Store is a historic commercial building located at St. Clair, Franklin County, Missouri. It was built in 1917–1918, and is a one-story, vernacular wood-frame building.  The building measures approximately 20 feet wide by 40 feet deep and has a gable roof with false front.

It was listed on the National Register of Historic Places in 1990.

References

Commercial buildings on the National Register of Historic Places in Missouri
Commercial buildings completed in 1918
Buildings and structures in Franklin County, Missouri
National Register of Historic Places in Franklin County, Missouri
1918 establishments in Missouri
Feed stores